University College Absalon is one of eight regional organizations of different study sites in Denmark offering bachelor courses of all kinds in most of Zealand and some of the islands close to Zealand.

University College Absalon was established in 2007 and covers the region of Zealand. It offers fourteen professional bachelor degree programmes - two of which are taught in English. Furthermore, several international modules are offered each semester at different campuses. The two degrees offered in English are a Bachelor of Engineering in Biotechnology and an International Honour's degree in Teaching. The institution changed name in 2017 from University College Zealand.

Absalon can be found on Facebook and Instagram.

Programmes

Campus Holbæk
 Nursing

Campus Kalundborg
 Engineering in Biotechnology (in English and Danish)
 Biomedical Laboratory Science
 Mechanical Engineering

Campus Nykøbing F
 Nursing
 Social Education
 Social Work

Campus Næstved
 Biomedical Laboratory Science
 Nursing
 Occupational Therapy
 Physiotherapy
 Public Administration
 Radiography
 Healthcare Administration

Campus Roskilde
 Education
 Leisure Management
 Nursing
 Physiotherapy
 Social Education
 Social Work

Campus Slagelse
 Nursing
 Social Education
 Midwifery
 Nutrition and Health

Campus Vordingborg
 International Honours Degree in Teaching (in English)
 Social Education

English Language programmes

Bachelor of Engineering in Biotechnology

The Bachelor of Engineering in Biotechnology is a new programmed started in 2017 in close cooperation with Biotech companies with production in the Kalundborg area. The biotech companies in Kalundborg collaborate as part of the Kalundborg Eco-industrial Park which forms an industrial symbiosis network. Among the companies in the area is the pharmaceutical company Novo Nordisk which has the world's largest insulin manufacturing site in Kalundborg.

The biotech programme combines biology, chemistry and science of engineering and students learn hands on with cases and projects in the international biotech companies that are located in Kalundborg. Students will have a paid internship in their last year as well as student job possibilities in the biotech companies.

International Honours Degree in Teaching

The International Honours Degree in Teaching is located in the town of Vordingborg on the southwest coast of Zealand. The programme is focused on students who wish to become teachers with an international profile. The programme was developed due to the increased number of international schools worldwide, that is creating a high demand for teachers with intercultural competences. As a response to this demand, University College Absalon developed an honours degree with an international focus.

References

External links 

Colleges in Denmark
Universities in Denmark
Educational institutions established in 2007
2007 establishments in Denmark